Marmon Motor Company was a Texas-based manufacturer of exclusive trucks from 1963 through 1997.

History 
In 1963, after Marmon-Herrington, the successor to the Marmon Motor Car Company, ceased truck production, a new company, Marmon Motor Company of Denton, Texas, purchased and revived the Marmon brand to build and sell premium truck designs that Marmon-Herrington had been planning.

The Marmon truck was a low-production, handmade truck sometimes dubbed the Rolls-Royce of trucks. An overcrowded American truck industry and the lack of a nationwide sales network led to the eventual failure of Marmon trucks in the USA. The last Marmon was made in 1997, and the production facilities in Garland, Texas, were taken over by Navistar’s Paystar division.

Models 
Models of Marmon trucks over the decades have included:

Gallery

External links 

 Marmon trucks
 Marmon trucks pictures
 Marmon Group Home page

Defunct truck manufacturers of the United States
Defunct motor vehicle manufacturers of the United States
Manufacturing companies based in Texas
Companies based in Garland, Texas
American companies established in 1963
Vehicle manufacturing companies established in 1963
Manufacturing companies disestablished in 1997
Defunct manufacturing companies based in Texas